The handsome fruiteater (Pipreola formosa) is a species of bird in the family Cotingidae. It is endemic to coastal mountains of northern Venezuela. Its natural habitat is subtropical or tropical moist montane forests.

Description
The male handsome fruiteater has a black head and throat, and green upper parts, with pale tips to the tertial feathers of the wings. It has a bright orange upper breast and a yellow belly. The female lacks black on head and throat but otherwise has similar green upper parts, including white-tipped tertials. The throat is green above a small patch of yellow. The rest of the underparts are either barred or scaled in green and yellow. The male is distinctive as no other fruiteaters within its range have a similar orange breast. The female can be distinguished from the golden-breasted fruiteater (P. aureopectus) as the female golden-breasted fruiteater does not have a yellow chest patch and has streaked underparts instead of barring seen in the handsome fruiteater.

Distribution and habitat
It occupies two disjunct areas.

Ecology
The main diet of the handsome fruiteater is small fruits, either eaten while perched, or grabbed in a brief period of hovering flight. It is sometimes seen feeding for a short while in mixed-species flocks. Little is known of its reproductive habits, but it has been observed to be moulting in June and July and has presumably bred before this.

Status
This bird is endemic to Venezuela and has a relatively small range, but it is reported as being fairly common. Its total population is unknown but the population trend seems to be stable so the International Union for Conservation of Nature has assessed the bird as being a "least-concern species".

References

External links

handsome fruiteater
Birds of the Venezuelan Coastal Range
Endemic birds of Venezuela
handsome fruiteater
Taxonomy articles created by Polbot